John Donovan "Jack" Gardner (born 27 September 1954) is a retired lieutenant general in the United States Army.  He is the former deputy commander of the United States European Command in Stuttgart, Germany.  During his career he served in Europe, Asia, Latin America, Bosnia, Iraq and numerous locations throughout the United States. He currently serves as the director of the 21st Century Jobskills Project, a nonprofit organization focused on assisting public school students in transitioning to living wage jobs. Gardner is a native of Columbus, Ohio.

Past assignments

Deputy Commander MNF-I for detainee operations
Gardner was assigned as deputy commander for detainee operations/Commander of Task Force 134, Multinational Force Iraq. His oversight included all detainee operations at Camp Bucca, Camp Cropper, Fort Suse and Abu Ghraib prison as well as operations at Camp Ashraf.  Both Fort Suse and Abu Ghraib prison were returned to Iraq control during his tenure.

U.S. Army South
Gardner was the commander of the United States Army South where he oversaw American military operations in 31 countries and 13 dependencies, in Central and South America and the Caribbean. His operational area of responsibility covered over 15.6 million square miles (40.4 million km2) of area, or one-sixth of the world's surface.

Other assignments
Deputy commanding general for transformation, U.S. Army Training and Doctrine Command, Fort Lewis
Assistant division commander (support), 25th Infantry Division (Light) with duty as deputy commanding general, Multinational Division (North), Stabilization Force-11, Task Force Eagle, Operation Joint Forge, Bosnia
Assistant deputy chief of staff – United Nations Command/Combined Forces Command/United States Forces Korea Yong San, Korea
Brigade Commander in the 3d Infantry Division
Battalion Commander, 1-506th Infantry Battalion, 2nd Infantry Division
Company Commander of Alpha Company, 1st Battalion, 4th Infantry in Aschaffenburg, Germany.

Gardner retired from active duty in the Army in May 2012.

Education
Gardner is a graduate of West Point in 1976 and the Army Command and General Staff College. In addition Gardner holds a master's degree from Georgetown University, and completed a Senior Service College Fellowship at Harvard University.

U.S. decorations and badges

 Defense Distinguished Service Medal
 Army Distinguished Service Medal
 Defense Superior Service Medal
 Legion of Merit  (with 3 Oak Leaf Clusters)
 Bronze Star Medal
 Meritorious Service Medal  (with 5 Oak Leaf Clusters)
 Army Commendation Medal  (with Oak Leaf Cluster)
 Army Achievement Medal
 Expert Infantryman Badge
 Senior Parachutist Badge
 Pathfinder Badge
 Ranger Tab

References

External links
Generals get new assignments Army Times
U.S., Citing Abuse in Iraqi Prisons, Holds Detainees New York Times
Stone Assumes Command of MNF-I Detainee Operations MNF-I Press Release
MG Jack Gardner departs, BG Keen in as USARSO turns a new page in its proud history
LTG John D. Gardner, Bio of Deputy Commander Land Component Command Heidelberg

1954 births
Living people
People from Columbus, Ohio
United States Military Academy alumni
Military personnel from Ohio
United States Army Rangers
United States Army Command and General Staff College alumni
Georgetown University alumni
United States Army personnel of the Iraq War
Recipients of the Meritorious Service Medal (United States)
Harvard University alumni
Recipients of the Legion of Merit
United States Army generals
Recipients of the Defense Superior Service Medal
Recipients of the Distinguished Service Medal (US Army)
Recipients of the Defense Distinguished Service Medal
People from Alexandria, Virginia